Minter is an English surname. Notable people with the surname include:

Alan Minter (1951–2020), English boxer
A. J. Minter (born 1993), American baseball player
Anne Minter (born 1963), Australian tennis player 
Barry Minter (born 1970), American football player
Billy Minter (1888–1940), English football player, trainer, and manager
Billy M. Minter (1926–2005), United States Air Force general
Cedric Minter (born 1958), Canadian football player
Daniel Minter (born 1963), African American painter and sculptor
DeMario Minter (born 1984), American football player
Frederick Minter (1887–1976), English civil engineer
George Minter (1911–1966), English producer
Kevin Minter (born 1990), American football player
Louisiana Red (born Iverson Minter, 1932), American blues guitarist, harmonica player, and singer
Jeff Minter (born 1962), British computer programmer and video game author
Kristin Minter (born 1965), American actress
Kelly Jo Minter (born 1966), American actress
Kirby Minter (1929–2009), American basketball player
Mary Miles Minter (1902–1984), American silent film actress
Mike Minter (born 1974), American football player
Patti Minter, American politician
Rick Minter (born 1954), American football coach
Sue Minter (born 1961), American politician
Shannon Minter (born 1961), American attorney

Fictional characters:
Rob Minter, in the BBC soap opera EastEnders

Surnames
Surnames of English origin
Surnames of British Isles origin
English-language surnames